In a scientific study, post hoc analysis (from Latin post hoc, "after this") consists of statistical analyses that were specified after the data were seen. They are usually used to uncover specific differences between three or more group means when an analysis of variance (ANOVA) test is significant. This typically creates a multiple testing problem because each potential analysis is effectively a statistical test. Multiple testing procedures are sometimes used to compensate, but that is often difficult or impossible to do precisely. Post hoc analysis that is conducted and interpreted without adequate consideration of this problem is sometimes called data dredging by critics because the statistical associations that it finds are often spurious.

Common post hoc tests 
Some common post hoc tests include: 

 Holm-Bonferroni Procedure
 Newman-Keuls
 Rodger’s Method
 Scheffé’s Method
 Tukey’s Test (see also: Studentized Range Distribution)

Causes 
Sometimes the temptation to engage in post hoc analysis is motivated by a desire to produce positive results or see a project as successful. In the case of pharmaceutical research, there may be significant financial consequences to a failed trial.

See also 
HARKing
Testing hypotheses suggested by the data
Nemenyi test

References

Data analysis
Multiple comparisons
Clinical research
Medical statistics